Merianthera is a genus of flowering plants belonging to the family Melastomataceae.

Its native range is Eastern Brazil.

Species
Species:

Merianthera bullata 
Merianthera burlemarxii 
Merianthera eburnea 
Merianthera parvifolia 
Merianthera pulchra 
Merianthera sipolisii 
Merianthera verrucosa

References

Melastomataceae
Melastomataceae genera